Country Heights Kajang is a township located in Kajang, Selangor, Malaysia. This township was opened in 1992. A former Rubber Plantation estate, this 480 acre land was transformed into the "Beverly Hills of Malaysia", the country's first gated and guarded country-living community.

Country Heights Resort
Country Heights Resort and Leisure (CHRL) is a resort in Country Heights. CHRL offers residents sports, banquet, food and beverage facilities.

Notable residents
Tun Dr Mahathir Mohamad - former Malaysian Prime Minister (1981–2003, 2018-2020)
Yusry Abdul Halim - Musician, Celebrity, Film Director
YB Santhara Kumar - Politician, Member of Parliament

Transportation

Car
Exit 210 on the PLUS toll road.

Public transportation
The KTMB tracks run through the eastern boundary of the housing area but does not stop here. Nearest railway stations are MRT/Komuter  and Komuter .

External links
Country Heights Resort

Townships in Selangor
Kajang